Andrea Zini (born 3 January 1998) is an Italian footballer who plays as a forward for Serie D club Ghiviborgo.

Club career
Zini started his career in Empoli, he never played a senior match in Empoli, the team won the 2017–18 Serie B. On the summer of 2018, Serie C side Arezzo signed him. He made his professional debut in the 6th round of 2018–19 Serie C, on 15 October 2018 against Pontedera, coming in as a substitute for Matteo Brunori Sandri in the 89th minute.

On 9 February 2022, Zini moved to San Donato in Serie D.

On 11 July 2022, Zini signed with Serie D club Pistoiese. After just two games in the 2022–23 season, he moved to a different Serie D club, Ghiviborgo.

References

External links
 
 

1998 births
Living people
Sportspeople from Pisa
Footballers from Tuscany
Association football forwards
Italian footballers
S.S. Arezzo players
U.S. Pianese players
Latina Calcio 1932 players
San Donato Tavarnelle players
U.S. Pistoiese 1921 players
Serie C players
Serie D players